The 2018–19 Mirwais Nika Provincial 3-Day was the first edition of the Mirwais Nika Provincial 3-Day tournament, a first-class cricket competition in Afghanistan, that ran from 15 February to 15 March 2019. The five competing provincial sides were representing their regions after having come through regional qualifying events. In the final, the match finished as a draw, with Kabul Province declared as the winner, after taking a first innings lead.

Points table
The following teams competed in the tournament:

 Advanced to the final

Fixtures

Round-robin

Final

References

External links
 Series home at ESPN Cricinfo

Mirwais Nika Provincial 3-Day
Mirwais Nika Provincial 3-Day